Once Upon a Time in the Oued (or Il était une fois dans l'oued) is a 2005 French comedy film directed by Djamel Bensalah.

Plot
Johnny Leclerc, from a Norman mother and an Alsatian father lives in a company in suburban city of his friends, mostly North Africans. He behaves like a Muslim, make the Ramadan and wear a djellaba. He is even persuaded to be called Abdul Bashir and to be born in a small village of Bled. When his friend Yacine has some trouble with a local guy and decides to return for holidays in Algeria, he sailed clandestinely in the luggage of the Sabri family to fulfill his dream and finally know his "roots". Just arrived on the Algerian coast, Johnny feels like home.

Cast

 Julien Courbey as Johnny Leclerc / Abdel Bachir
 Sid Ahmed Agoumi as Monsieur Sabri
 David Saracino as Yacine
 Marilou Berry as Nadège
 Karina Testa as Nadia
 Amina Annabi as Madame Khiera Sabri
 Medy Kerouani as Medy
 Karim Belkhadra as The Godfather
 Frankie Pain as Johnny's mother
 Max Morel as Johnny's father
 Mohamed Kafi as The Uncle
 Souhila Yagoubi as Aunt Alima
 Élie Semoun as The butler
 Ramzy Bedia & Éric Judor as The costume seller
 Olivier Baroux as The Swiss

References

External links

2005 films
2005 comedy films
French comedy films
2000s French-language films
2000s French films